Backhousia is a genus of thirteen currently known species of flowering plants in the family Myrtaceae. All the currently known species are endemic to Australia in the rainforests and seasonally dry forests of Queensland, New South Wales and Western Australia.

In 1845 in the European science publication the Botanical Magazine William Jackson Hooker and William Henry Harvey first published this genus's formal description and name, after botanist James Backhouse from England and Australia.

Species
Sourced from the authoritative Australian Plant Name Index and Australian Plant Census . For taxa including undescribed species further afield outside Australia, for example likely in New Guinea, this list lacks them—refer also to the genus Kania.
 Backhousia angustifolia , curry myrtle, narrow leaf myrtle 
 Backhousia bancroftii , Johnstone River hardwood 
 Backhousia citriodora , lemon scented myrtle, sweet verbena tree, lemon scented verbena, lemon ironwood 
 Backhousia enata 
 Backhousia gundarara ; formerly Backhousia sp. Prince Regent (W.O'Sullivan & D.Dureau WODD 42) WA Herbarium 
 Backhousia hughesii , stony backhousia, stonewood, lime wood, grey teak 
 Backhousia kingii  
 Backhousia leptopetala , former name: Choricarpia leptopetala , brush turpentine, brown myrtle
 Backhousia myrtifolia , grey myrtle, carrol, ironwood, neverbreak, iron myrtle, cinnamon myrtle 
 Backhousia oligantha 
 Backhousia sciadophora , shatterwood, ironwood, boomerang tree 
 Backhousia subargentea , former name: Choricarpia subargentea , giant ironwood, scrub ironwood, lancewood, ironwood box
 Backhousia tetraptera 

Formerly included here
 Backhousia anisata was transferred to Anetholea anisata, and later to Syzygium anisatum.

References

 
Flora of Queensland
Flora of New South Wales
Rosids of Western Australia
Myrtales of Australia
Myrtaceae genera
Endemic flora of Australia